Gnanalaya is one of India's largest private libraries with rare first edition books, founded by B. Krishnamurthy and his wife Dorothy.

Location
The library is situated at Palaniappa Nagar, Thirukkokarnam in Pudukottai, Tamil Nadu, India. It has been built at a height of 14 feet with windows at nine feet to let natural light and air work wonders.

Collection
Having more than 15,000 titles in English and 70,000 titles in Tamil it has a large collection of rare first editions of Tamil books and had selected treasures. This library was instrumental in reviving old and out of print, resulting in more than 3000 books being reprinted.

Selected First Editions
 Veeramamunivar's 'Sathur Agarathy' (1842)
 French-Tamil Dictionary (1855)
 Tamil-Latin dictionary (1867)
 Standard edition of the Thiruvarutpa (1887)
 Vedanayagam Pillai's first novel 'Prathapa Mudaliar Charithram'

Other selected treasures
 Letters of Rajaji
 Bharathiyar's daughter Thangammal Bharathi's first editions of Bharathi and Bharathidasan
 Revolutionary magazines 'Kudiarasu', 'Viduthalai'
 Gandhi's 'Harijan'
 Back issues of 'Reader's Digest' from the first Indian edition
 Tamil literary magazines from 1920 to 2010.

References

External links
Gnanalaya Research Library, Pudukottai, in Tamil
Gnanalaya - Digital Library for International Research (DLIR)
Gnanalaya Research Library, in Tamil
 Stalin donates 370 books, The Hindu, Trichy, 30 March 2017

Libraries in Tamil Nadu